Ouranio Toxo (Greek: Ουράνιο Τόξο; English: Rainbow) is the sixth Greek-language studio album and ninth overall studio album by Greek singer Helena Paparizou, released on 15 December 2017, in Greece and Cyprus by EMI Music Greece.

Track listing

Charts

Certifications

References

External links
Official site
Elena on iTunes

2017 albums
Helena Paparizou albums